Varennes-sur-Seine (literally Varennes on Seine) is a commune in the Seine-et-Marne department in the Île-de-France region in north-central France.

Demographics
Inhabitants of Varennes-sur-Seine are called Varennois.

See also
 Communes of the Seine-et-Marne department

References

External links

 

Communes of Seine-et-Marne